Historians of mathematics have noted the involvement of prominent mathematicians in politics at various times and places, notably in Italy during the period of unification at the end of the nineteenth century.

Those who become legislators attempt to use their mathematical skills to legitimise their political positions. However, some parliamentary colleagues tend to view them as failing to connect with the real world.

A maths columnist for Forbes suggested in 2018 that mathematicians in politics would contribute strengths including problem-solving, creativity, overcoming challenges, and collaboration.

John Derbyshire observed in 2003 that mathematicians have no dominant tendency; for example, Cauchy was a reactionary whereas Galois was a radical. He opines that the most influential research mathematicians do not give much thought to politics.

Notable mathematician-politicians

This is a list of people who at some points in their lives achieved notability both as academically-trained mathematicians (with a graduate degree, or published in mathematical journals) and also as elected politicians (at a state or national level).

 Tadatoshi Akiba (born 1942), member of parliament and mayor of Hiroshima in Japan
 Kazimierz Bartel (1882–1941), prime minister and senator in Poland
 Muhammad Baydoun (1952–2022), member of parliament and government minister in Lebanon
 Vaclav Benda (1946–1999), senator in the Czech Republic
 Alberto Beneduce (1877–1944), member of the Italian Reformist Socialist Party and minister of labour and social security
 Boris Berezovsky (1946–2013), member of the security council and parliament of Russia
 Daniel Biss (born 1977), member of the Illinois Senate and mayor of Evanston, Illinois in the United States
 Émile Borel (1871–1956), member of parliament and government minister in France
 Francesco Brioschi (1824–1897), member of parliament in Italy
 Rudranath Capildeo (1920–1970), member of parliament in Trinidad and Tobago
 Lazare Carnot (1753–1823), member of parliament and government in France
 Ahmed Chalabi (1944–2015), member of parliament and government in Iraq
 Marquis de Condorcet (1743–1794), member of parliament in France
 Luigi Cremona (1830–1903), senator and government minister in Italy
 Ulisse Dini (1845–1918), member of parliament in |Italy
 Charles Dupin (1784–1873), government minister and senator in France
 Sergio Fajardo (born 1956), department governor in Colombia
 Ute Finckh-Krämer (born 1956), member of parliament in Germany
 Taj Haider (born 1942), senator in Pakistan
 Nadia Hashem, Minister of State for Women's Affairs (2012)
 Daniel Hershkowitz (born 1953), member of the Knesset and government minister in Israel
 Reinhard Höppner (1948–2014), minister-president of Saxony-Anhalt in Germany
 Eri Jabotinsky (1910–1969), member of the Knesset in Israel
 Hermine Agavni Kalustyan (1914–1989), member of parliament in Turkey
 Alexander Lubotzky (born 1956), member of the Knesset in Israel
 Jerry McNerney (born 1951), congressman in the United States
 Michael Meister (born 1961), member of parliament in Germany
 Luigi Federico Menabrea (1809–1896), Prime Minister of Italy
 Keith Mitchell (born 1946), Prime Minister of Grenada
 Gaspard Monge (1746–1818), government minister in France
 Mohammad-Ali Najafi (born 1952), minister of education in Iran and Mayor of Tehran
 Paul Painlevé (1863–1933), Prime Minister of France
 Walter Romberg (1928–2014), minister in East Germany's only democratically elected government
 George Saitoti (1945–2012), Vice-President of Kenya
 Blagovest Sendov (1932–2020), Chairman of the National Assembly of Bulgaria
 Frank Terpe (born 1929), minister in East Germany's only democratically elected government
 Faustin-Archange Touadéra (born 1957), Prime Minister and President of the Central African Republic
 Cédric Villani (born 1973), deputy in France

References

Lists of politicians
Politicians
Lists of people by second occupation